Millet is a French surname.

Geographical distribution
As of 2014, 73.0% of all known bearers of the surname Millet were residents of France (frequency 1:2,403), 12.3% of the United States (1:77,572), 3.9% of Spain (1:31,522) and 1.6% of the Philippines (1:164,078).

In France, the frequency of the surname was higher than national average (1:2,403) in the following regions:
 1. Centre-Val de Loire (1:968)
 2. Bourgogne-Franche-Comté (1:1,109)
 3. Auvergne-Rhône-Alpes (1:1,928)
 4. Nouvelle-Aquitaine (1:2,164)

People
Aimé Millet, French sculptor
Andrea Millet, Italian luger 
Catherine Millet, French writer
Denise Millet, French illustrator
Floyd Millet, American college football coach
Francis Davis Millet (1848-1912), American painter and writer
Francisque Millet, 17th-century Flemish-French painter
Jean-François Millet, 19th-century French painter
Gabriel Millet (1867–1953), French archaeologist
Lydia Millet, American writer
Maelle Millet (born 2004), French rhythmic gymnast
Nicholas Millet, American-Canadian Egyptologist
Nisha Millet, Indian Olympic swimmer
Pierre Millet, French Jesuit missionary
Richard Millet, French author
Robert L. Millet, American religious scholar

References

French-language surnames
Surnames of French origin